Vocus may refer to:

 Vocus Group, an Australian communications company
 Vocus (software), a software company based in Maryland, United States